Frank Lee Frazier (June 15, 1960 – November 3, 2000) was an American football guard in the National Football League for the Washington Redskins in 1987.  He played college football at the University of Miami.

1960 births
2000 deaths
Players of American football from Tampa, Florida
American football offensive guards
Miami Hurricanes football players
Washington Redskins players